Brian Green KC (born 1956) is an English barrister.

He was born in Ilford and attended Ilford County High School and St. Edmund Hall, Oxford.  After gaining a double first from Oxford University, he was a lecturer at LSE, 1978–85 and a tutor at St. Edmund Hall, 1978–80.

He was called to the Bar in 1980 and appointed a Queen's Counsel in 1997.

In 2009, he won an important Court of Appeal case on pensions.

Chambers and Partners Directory rate him as a star individual for traditional chancery and for pensions work, and Band 1 for Offshore work.  He was awarded Chancery QC of the Year 2006 Chambers Bar Awards  and Barrister of the Year 2007 at the STEP Private Client Awards .

References 
 Who's Who 2013
  Entry in Debretts
  Entry in Chambers and Partners Directory
  Entry in the Legal 500 Directory
  Article in The Lawyer, 17 February 1998
  Citywealth list 2010

English lawyers
English Jews
1956 births
Living people
People from Ilford
People educated at Ilford County High School